Izan Guevara Bonnin (born 28 June 2004) is a Spanish Grand Prix motorcycle racer set to compete for the GasGas Aspar Team in the 2023 Moto2 World Championship. Guevara is also the winner of the 2020 FIM CEV Moto3 Junior World Championship.

Career statistics

FIM CEV Moto3 Junior World Championship

Races by year
(key) (Races in bold indicate pole position, races in italics indicate fastest lap)

Red Bull MotoGP Rookies Cup

Races by year
(key) (Races in bold indicate pole position; races in italics indicate fastest lap)

Grand Prix motorcycle racing

By season

By class

Races by year
(key) (Races in bold indicate pole position; races in italics indicate fastest lap)

References

External links

2004 births
Living people
Spanish motorcycle racers
Moto3 World Championship riders
Sportspeople from Palma de Mallorca
Moto3 World Riders' Champions